Diaperis is a genus of darkling beetle with species known from Asia, Europe, and the Americas. Some species were formerly been placed in the genus Allophasia. A species described in this genus is now Serrania viridula (Zayas, 1989).

Species in the genus include:
 Diaperis bifida Triplehorn and Brendell
 Diaperis boleti (Linnaeus, 1758)
 Diaperis boleti bipustulata Laporte & Brullé, 1831
 Diaperis californica Blaisdell, 1929
 Diaperis coccinea Laporte de Castelnau, 1840
 Diaperis fryi (Pascoe)
 Diaperis lewisi Bates
 Diaperis lewisi intersecta Gebien, 1913
 Diaperis maculata Olivier 1791 
 Diaperis marseuli (Bates)
 Diaperis nigronotata Pic 1926
 Diaperis rufipes Horn, 1870

References

Tenebrionidae
Tenebrionidae genera